The 1969–70 Washington Caps season was the first and only one for the franchise in the American Basketball Association. On August 21, 1969, the Oakland Oaks moved to Washington, D.C., due to substantial financial losses despite winning the second-ever ABA championship only weeks earlier. The franchise was purchased for $2.6 million by a group led by Earl Foreman, Thomas Shaheen and Louis Diamond. 

However reluctantly, superstar forward Rick Barry was among seven members of the talented Oaks team who made the move from coast to coast. It was grossly misplaced in the Western Division, however, which resulted in a brutal travel schedule. Not only did the team have to compete against the NBA's more established Baltimore Bullets nearby, but it lacked a modern arena to attract fans and forge a home-court advantage. It played several designated home games at neutral sites, including five in Los Angeles, nearly 2,700 miles from home. 

Despite these hardships, the Caps did well to finish in third place with a respectable 44-40 record and earn a playoff berth. They faced the Denver Rockets in round one, losing in seven games despite Barry's heroic 52-point performance in Game 7 on the road. It marked the first and to date only time that a player scored as many as 50 points in a seventh game at the ABA or NBA level.  

In anticipation of an ABA–NBA merger that would take years to complete, Foreman was encouraged to move the team from Washington to placate the Bullets after the season. For the third time in as many years, the franchise played in a different state in the 1969-70 campaign, this time as a regional team known as Virginia Squires.

Roster   
20 Mike Barrett – Shooting guard
24 Rick Barry – Small forward
30 Gary Bradds – Power forward
11 Larry Brown
34 Frank Card – Power forward
40 George Carter – Small forward
42 Jim Eakins – Center
33 Ira Harge – Center
15 Warren Jabali – Shooting guard
21 Hal Jeter – Guard
12 Henry Logan – Shooting guard
14/54 Roland Taylor – Point guard
-- Ron Taylor – Center
31 George Tinsley – Small forward

Final standings

Western Division

Playoffs
Western Division Semifinals vs. Denver Rockets

Caps lose series, 4–3

Awards, records, and honors
1970 ABA All-Star Game played on January 24, 1970
 Rick Barry
 Warren Jabali
 Larry Brown

References

 Caps on Basketball Reference

Washington
Washington Caps
Washington Caps, 1969-70
Washington Caps, 1969-70